Salli Karuna (1902–1987) was a Finnish film actress. She was married to the actor Ilmari Unho.

Selected filmography
 Gabriel, Come Back (1951)
 Mother or Woman (1953)

References

Bibliography 
 Tad Bentley Hammer. International film prizes: an encyclopedia. Garland, 1991.

External links 
 

1902 births
1987 deaths
People from Rauma, Finland
People from Turku and Pori Province (Grand Duchy of Finland)
Finnish stage actresses
Finnish film actresses
Finnish television actresses